Amalosia rhombifer, also known commonly as the zigzag velvet gecko and the zig-zag gecko, is a species of lizard in the family Diplodactylidae. The species is endemic to Australia.

Description
It is light brown on the back, darker brown on the sides, and white or off-white below. The limbs can be speckled, pale brown, or dark brown. The coloring makes it appear to have a zigzag edge on the sides, and tail.

Geographic distribution
A. rhombifer is found in northern Australia, in the Kimberley region, in Western Australia, and up to northern Queensland. Some species have been reported in the Alice Springs region.

Habitat
The zigzag gecko prefers wooded habitats, and has been found under the bark of deteriorating trees, but has also been recorded in areas with rubbish or buildings.

Behavior
A. rhombifer is usually arboreal, but sometimes seeks shelter beneath ground litter.

Reproduction
A. rhombifer is oviparous.

Threats
The zigzag velvet gecko is a rare species. Until 2002, no recent records existed. In 2002, one specimen was found near Warialda, New South Wales, another in Bebo State Forest, and third specimen discovered in Arakoola Nature Reserve, south of Bebo.

The species is severely endangered, due to habitat loss from logging, and bush fires, predators such as foxes, and feral cats, and the nature of the isolation of the gecko's population, resulting in a lack of genetic variability. The New South Wales National Parks and Wildlife Service report that the species is likely to become extinct, without intervention.

References

Further reading
Cogger HG (2014). Reptiles and Amphibians of Australia, Seventh Edition. Clayton, Victoria, Australia: CSIRO Publishing. xxx + 1,033 pp. .
Gray JE (1845). Catalogue of the Specimens of Lizards in the Collection of the British Museum. London: Trustees of the British Museum. (Edward Newman, printer). xxviii + 289 pp. ("Œdura rhombifer ", new species, p. 147).
Rösler H (1995). Geckos der Welt: Alle Gattungen. Leipzig: Urania Verlag. 256 pp. (Oedura rhombifer, p. 82). (in German).
Wilson S, Swan G (2013). A Complete Guide to Reptiles of Australia, Fourth Edition. Sydney: New Holland Publishers. 522 pp. .

Reptiles of Western Australia
Amalosia
Reptiles described in 1845
Taxa named by John Edward Gray
Geckos of Australia